Katilon Ke Kaatil is a 1981 Indian Bollywood action thriller film, produced and directed by Arjun Hingorani. This film stars Dharmendra (who previously appeared in Hingorani's Kahani Kismat Ki), Rishi Kapoor, Zeenat Aman, Tina Munim, Nirupa Roy, Shakti Kapoor and Amjad Khan. The music is by Kalyanji Anandji. The film is known for its hit music and several exploitation film gimmicks, including the appearance of Bruce Lee lookalike Bruce Le (capitalizing on the Bruceploitation trend) as well as a character called Reecha who resembles General Ursus from Planet of the Apes. The film became a super hit at the Indian box office.

Cast
Dharmendra as Ajit / Badshah
Rishi Kapoor as Munna
Zeenat Aman as Jameela Banu
Tina Munim as Petty Thief
Nirupa Roy
Shakti Kapoor as Jimmy / Micheal
Amjad Khan as Black Cobra
Bruce Le as Goon
Arjun Hingorani as Fakeer
Manorama as Lady with necklace
Shamsuddin as Reecha
Hera Lal as Munshi 
Keshto Mukherjee as Husband of the lady with necklace
Shivraj as Jamila's Dad

Soundtrack
Lyrics: Rajendra Krishan

Reception and legacy
The film became a box office super hit.

Retrospectively, the film is best known for its hit music and several exploitation film gimmicks. Capitalizing on Bruce Lee's popularity in India, the film exploited the Bruceploitation trend from Hong Kong action cinema, with the appearance of Bruce Lee lookalike Bruce Le in the film. It also featured a special character called Reecha, who was born of a woman and a wild bear, and resembles General Ursus from Planet of the Apes.

Notes

References

External links
 

1980s exploitation films
1980s Hindi-language films
1981 action thriller films
1981 films
Bruceploitation films
Films about bears
Films scored by Kalyanji Anandji
Indian action thriller films